Camalote may refer to:
 Camalote, Belize, a village in Cayo District, Belize
 Paspalum plicatulum, a species of grass